The Swinging Mr. Rogers is an album by American jazz trumpeter, composer and arranger Shorty Rogers, released on the Atlantic label in 1955.

Reception

Scott Yanow of Allmusic calls the album "one of trumpeter Shorty Rogers' finest small group sessions of the 1950s".

Track listing 
All compositions by Shorty Rogers except where noted.
 "Isn't It Romantic?" (Richard Rodgers, Lorenz Hart) - 5:44
 "Trickley Didlier" - 4:41
 "Oh Play That Thing" - 6:31
 "Not Really the Blues" (Johnny Mandel) - 4:58
 "Martians Go Home" - 7:56
 "My Heart Stood Still" (Rodgers, Hart) - 6:12
 "Michele's Meditation" - 3:55
 "That's What I'm Talkin' 'Bout" - 5:33

Personnel 
Shorty Rogers - trumpet
Jimmy Giuffre - clarinet, tenor saxophone, baritone saxophone
Pete Jolly - piano
Curtis Counce - bass 
Shelly Manne - drums

References 

Shorty Rogers albums
1955 albums
Atlantic Records albums
Albums produced by Nesuhi Ertegun